Melaleuca lophocoracorum is a plant in the myrtle family Myrtaceae and is endemic to a small area in the Ravenshoe State Forest, near Ravenshoe in Queensland. It is a newly described (2013) species of shrub or small tree with twisted leaves and spikes of cream-coloured flowers in summer. It is similar to Melaleuca squamophloia and Melaleuca styphelioides.

Description 

The flowers are cream-coloured and arranged in spikes on the ends of branches which continue to grow after flowering and also on the sides of the branches. The stamens are arranged in five bundles around the flower with 15 to 25 stamens per bundle. The fruit retain the seeds for more than 3 years or until the plant is burned or the part bearing the fruit dies. The sepals remain as teeth around the edge of the fruit, usually for more than a year.

Taxonomy and naming
Melaleuca lophocoracorum was discovered in 2012 and first formally described in 2013 by Andrew Ford, Lyn Craven and Joe Brophy in Telopea from a specimen collected on the walking track to Bally Knob near Ravenshoe.  The specific epithet (lophocoracorum) is from the Ancient Greek word lophos meaning “crest” and korax meaning "raven", because "hoe" in "Ravenshoe" originally meant "ridge" or "crest of a hill", so that lophocoracorum is equivalent to Ravenshoe.

Distribution and habitat
This melaleuca is only known from an area of less than  near Ravenshoe, where there are thought to be no more than 600 individual plants. It grows in forest, generally in poorly-drained or swampy soil on rhyolite rock near creeks. There seems to be a correlation between the size of the plants and the depth of the soil in which they grow.

Ecology

Response to fire
After fire, M. lophocoracorum resprouts at the stem base and along stems from epicormic buds.

References

lophocoracorum
Myrtales of Australia
Flora of Queensland
Plants described in 2013